The Bacajá River is a river of Pará state in north-central Brazil. It is a tributary of the Xingu River.

The Bacajá River is a blackwater river. Its basin is in the Xingu–Tocantins–Araguaia moist forests ecoregion.

See also
List of rivers of Pará

References

Rivers of Pará